Antenna 3 ("Channel 3") may refer to:

 Antenna 3 Lombardia, a television station founded in Legnano in 1977 with the help of Enzo Tortora
 Antenna Tre Nordest, Italian local television station, operating in Triveneto

See also
 Antena 3 (disambiguation)